Dębowa Łęka is a village in the administrative district of Gmina Wschowa, within Wschowa County, Lubusz Voivodeship, in western Poland.

Until 1945, the village was part of Germany and was called Geyersdorf. It was the first German town occupied by enemy forces during World War II, in conjunction with the Raid on Fraustadt on 2 September 1939; Polish forces withdrew a few days later after the situation became untenable.

References

Villages in Wschowa County